Seh Cheshmeh (also Romanized as Seh Chashmeh; also known as Sar Cheshmeh) is a village in Sarduiyeh Rural District, Sarduiyeh District, Jiroft County, Kerman Province, Iran. At the 2006 census, its population was 145, in 23 families.

References 

Populated places in Jiroft County